Lake Ridge Schools Corporation is based in unincorporated Lake County, Indiana, United States and serves students within the unincorporated sections of the Calumet Township and portions of Gary.

Schools

Secondary schools

6-12 schools
Ensweiler Academy (Unincorporated area)
closed June 2010, now adult education & community center, 2012–13

High schools

Traditional
Calumet New Tech High School (Unincorporated area)

Middle schools
Lake Ridge New Tech Middle School (Unincorporated area)

Elementary schools
Grissom Elementary School (Gary)
Hosford Park Elementary School (Unincorporated area)
Longfellow Elementary School (Unincorporated area)

See also 
Gary Community School Corporation
Education in Gary, Indiana

References

External links

Education in Lake County, Indiana
School districts in Indiana
Education in Gary, Indiana
1956 establishments in Indiana
School districts established in 1956